Jan C. Dolan (January 15, 1927 – November 1, 2016) was a Republican member of the Michigan House of Representatives from 1989 through 1996.

Dolan graduated from the University of Akron and worked as a hospital dietitian. Dolan won election to the Farmington Hills city council in 1974 and served for 14 years. She was mayor on two occasions. Dolan won election to the House in 1988.

After leaving the House, she continued as a member of several community organizations. The City of Farmington Hills honored her with the Nancy Bates Distinguished Public Servant Award in May 2016. Dolan died on November 1, 2016, aged 89, of respiratory failure.

References

1927 births
2016 deaths
Republican Party members of the Michigan House of Representatives
University of Akron alumni
Mayors of places in Michigan
People from Farmington Hills, Michigan
Women city councillors in Michigan
Women mayors of places in Michigan
Women state legislators in Michigan
21st-century American women